The 4 April 2010 Baghdad bombings where a series of bomb explosions in Baghdad, Iraq.The attack killed 41 people and at least 200 were injured.

References

2010 murders in Iraq
21st-century mass murder in Iraq
Terrorist incidents in Iraq in 2010
Mass murder in 2010
Terrorist incidents in Baghdad
2010 in Iraq
Bombings in the Iraqi insurgency
2010s in Baghdad
Violence against Shia Muslims in Iraq
April 2010 events in Iraq
Attacks on buildings and structures in Iraq
Building bombings in Iraq